The 26th TVyNovelas Awards Colombia ceremony, took place on 16 September 2017 at the Chamorro Entertainment City Hall events center in Bogotá. The ceremony is presented by Iván López, and Mabel Moreno.

Winners and nominees 
Winners are listed first, highlighted in boldface, and indicated with a double dagger.

References 

2017 awards